Petrovka is a rural locality (a selo) in Burlinsky Selsoviet, Burlinsky District, Altai Krai, Russia. The population was 171 as of 2013. It was founded in 1909. There are 5 streets.

Geography 
Petrovka is located near the Burla river and the Bolshoye Topolnoye lake, 33 km northwest of Burla (the district's administrative centre) by road. Pervomayskoye is the nearest rural locality.

References 

Rural localities in Burlinsky District